Scinax caldarum is a species of frog in the family Hylidae.
It is endemic to Brazil.
Its natural habitats are subtropical or tropical seasonally wet or flooded lowland grassland, subtropical or tropical high-altitude grassland, freshwater marshes, intermittent freshwater marshes, pastureland, rural gardens, ponds, and canals and ditches.
It is threatened by habitat loss.

References

caldarum
Endemic fauna of Brazil
Amphibians described in 1968
Taxonomy articles created by Polbot